Jay Kim is a South Korean-born American entrepreneur living in California. He is the chairman of JemJem; an Internet resource for refurbished Apple products in the United States. Popular American internet media company BuzzFeed has rated JemJem as one of the best place to grab refurbished Apple products for refurbished iPhone and iPad in the United States. In addition to this, Kim also leads a few more companies including ePelican.com, Digitz.com, KristenKim.com, Chocolate.org, Blurfix.com, and DiamondBell.com.

Early life and education
Jay Kim was born on 10 November 1976 in South Korea to a South Korean family. He is elder of the two children born to the couple.  After graduating from high school, Kim attended the Bergen Community College for accounting, while working with general contractors part-time.

Career
Jay Kim is the CEO of JemJem. At JemJem, he puts robust consideration on recovering all the values in used Apple products and offers a refurbished version of them to the customers within their budget. Besides JemJem, Kim also serves as the chief executive officer at ePelican.com, Digitz.com, and KristenKim.com.

Startups
In 2017, Kim launched two tech products named Blurfix.com and DiamondBell.com. Blurfix is a 360-degree camera that records photographs and videos seamlessly, while DiamondBell offers wireless speaker and earbuds.

Acquisitions
In 2016, Kim acquired Chocolate.org, a marketplace for chocolate lovers that promotes small companies and chocolate artisans in the United States and Canada. The brand believes that the finest chocolates are found in small chocolate shops around the globe and every chef has a unique approach of crafting chocolate.

References

1976 births
Living people
American business executives
South Korean emigrants to the United States